The Li family of Kung Fu 李家功夫 is commonly known as one of the five famous family styles of Southern Chinese martial arts.

Li Sou 
The Li family is originally from Lanzhou in the Gansu province of China.
Legend has it that prior to Li Sou's development of Wu Xing Chuan (5 shape fist), he had learned various palm techniques that had been passed on to him by another member of the Li family. These techniques were called the Divine Immortal Palms, and consisted of Iron Bone Shattering Palm, Vibrating Palm, Cotton Palm, Burning Palm, Spiralling Palm, and Internal Iron Palm, which were taught to the Li family by a Taoist immortal and other traveling hermits from the Wudang and Emei Mountains.

Shaolin Wu Xing Quan/Ng Ying Kuen (5 Shape Fist) 

Originating from the 18 Luohan hands, Jueyuan in the 13th century expanded its 18 techniques to 72. Still, he felt the need to seek knowledge from outside the confines of the temple. In Gansu Province in the west of China, in the city of Lanzhou, he met Li Sou, a master of "Red Fist" Hóngquán (紅拳). Li Sou accompanied Jueyuan back to Henan, to Luoyang to introduce Jueyuan to Bai Yufeng, a master of an internal method and Wuzuquan. Li Sou's real name was Li Yuanshou (Li Sou means simply "old man").

They returned to Shaolin and expanded the 72 techniques to approximately 170. Additionally, using their combined knowledge, they inserted internal aspects to Shaolin boxing. They organized these techniques into Five Animals: the Tiger, the Crane, the Leopard, the Snake, and the Dragon.

Li Youshan/Lee Yau-san李友山

From Guandong Xin Hui, Li Youshan entered the Shaolin Temple and became a student of the Monk Jee Sin Sim See and Monk Li Sik-hoi/Li Xi-kai. His training focused around the 5 shape fist method along with other arts to create Li Jia, a short bridge style with long changeable footwork.

Li Yi李义(Lee the Righteous)（1744—1828年）

From Guandong Angle Fire Village is recorded as a founder of the Li Jia style.  It is possible that the 2 individuals are the same.

Not just known as the founder of the Li Jia/Lee Ga style, he was also the instructor to Chan Heung, the founder of the Choy Lee Fut style.

Theory and principles
Li Jia is a blending of the Hard Stable Southern Fist and the Quick Agility of the Northern School. The style is most famous for its Long Staff and Leg Skills.

(Stepping Skill Lively 步法灵活), (Good Explosive Leg Skills 擅用腿法), (Many Low Jumps 稍多跳跃)

(has Long Bridge Big Horse 是以长桥大马), (Leaning Body Leaning Step 偏身偏步), (Plain Solid Vigorous 朴实刚劲为主).

(Body Skill On Primary elbow attacking/striking 身法上则是以肘攻击为主), (Wanting Asking Sinking solid steady heavy 要求沉实稳重), (Exiting hand Firmly Accurate 出手准确), (As a result of by elbow attack primarily 由于是以肘攻击为主), ( 所以也要求着点准确),以避免一击不中,被别人有机可乘。

Hand Forms

Wu Lien Shou (Ng Lin Sou) - 5 connecting hands

Zhong Liu Lien (Chong Lok Lin)

Chi Lien Shou (Chat Lin Sou) - 7 connecting hands

Duan Kou (Dun Ko) - short

Shao Da (Siu Da) - small strike

and of course 36 elbows

Lin Fa Gua Sao – Lotus Hanging Hands

Jin Kau Duan Da – Arrow - Short Strike

Bat tui Siu Da  - 8 Pushes Small Strike

Say Sing Kuen - Four star fist

Sam Kuen - three fists

Shi Zun

Siu Sup Kuen - Small Cross Fist

Dai Sup Kuen - big Cross Fist

the enfilade select the shadowboxing

Bat Gua Kuen - 8 Diagram Fist

Hung Kuen - Red Fist to practice boxing red

the alone foot series fist,

ng Ying Kuen - 5 Shape Fist - five shape martial art combining various techniques fist

Weapons
Mainly has the single end stick, the odd and even fetters, to block the stick, the long line stick, south the double knife, the single tool, the double crowbar, arrowhead, Lu Zhen, Sha Dao, the Spring and Autumn Period broadsword, ying the gun, the double dagger, the martial art combining various techniques fan, three whips, the long and narrow bench and so on.

References 

Chinese martial arts